Continental Records was a record company founded by Donald H. Gabor in 1942 producing and releasing jazz, blues and classical music. Its catalogue included issues by Cozy Cole, Edmond Hall, Sabby Lewis, Slam Stewart, Mary Lou Williams, Rubberlegs Williams, Ethel Waters, and classical artists Georges Enesco, Béla Bartók, and Andor Foldes. The label's name was revived briefly in the 1960s.

See also
 List of record labels

References

External links
 Partial list of Continental recordings by catalog no.

1942 establishments in the United States
American record labels
Defunct record labels of the United States
Jazz record labels
Record labels established in 1942